Hollins Green is a village on the eastern edge of Warrington, in the Warrington district, in the ceremonial county of Cheshire, England, close to Glaze Brook, the boundary with Salford, in the civil parish of Rixton-with-Glazebrook; the ecclesiastical parish is Hollinfare.

The village has two pubs, the Red Lion and the Black Swan, a post office, village shop, barbers and community hall.

Educational institutions
The village houses St Helen's CofE Primary School as well as the Pre-School, which moved from the Community Hall to St Helen's at the beginning of the academic year in 2015. Children of Hollins Green generally attend Culcheth High School upon leaving St Helen's, as it is one of the feeder schools.

Transport

Hollins Green is served by the number 100 bus, provided by Go North West, travelling between Manchester Shudehill Interchange and Warrington Interchange. The 100 runs every hour towards the Trafford Centre and Manchester. Glazebrook railway station is within close reach of the village and can be used to commute to Manchester, Warrington and Liverpool. The station is served by Northern

Other features
Rixton Clay Pits is located at the west of the village and is an old clay extraction site; it is now a nature reserve and a Site of Special Scientific Interest.
The Manchester Ship Canal runs across the southern border of the village, utilising a partial stretch of the River Mersey.

The village also contains a Brick Works, the moated site of Rixton Old Hall, Rixton New Hall, Ramswood Garden Centre, St Helen's Church (C of E) and churchyard (on an ancient circular site bordered by a footpath called 'The Weint'), a cross commemorating those killed in both world wars, a Methodist chapel, a blacksmith and a cemetery.

A five kilometre road race, the Peter Lowe Memorial Hollins Green 5k, is held in the village on the first Saturday of June each year. Organised by Spectrum Striders Running Club, the course takes in country lanes through Hollins Green and Glazebrook and regularly attracts over 200 runners. The race forms part of the North Cheshire 5k Grand Prix series.

See also

Listed buildings in Rixton-with-Glazebrook

Further reading
 - autobiographical account of Hollins Green, referred to as Moss Ferry, circa 1909

External links
Warrington Council Community Page
Rixton Claypits Information

Villages in Cheshire
Geography of Warrington